Bettina Loved a Soldier is a 1916 American silent comedy film directed by Rupert Julian and starring Louise Lovely, George Berrell, and Francelia Billington. Made by Universal Pictures, it is based on the 1882 French novel The Abbot Constantine by Ludovic Halévy.

Cast
 Louise Lovely as Bettina Scott  
 George Berrell as Abbé Constantin  
 Rupert Julian as Jean Reynaud 
 Francelia Billington as Suzie Scott  
 Zoe Rae as Bella  
 Douglas Gerrard as Paul de Lacardens  
 Elsie Jane Wilson as Pauline

References

Bibliography
 Goble, Alan. The Complete Index to Literary Sources in Film. Walter de Gruyter, 1999.

External links

1916 films
Films directed by Rupert Julian
American silent feature films
1910s English-language films
Films set in France
Films based on French novels
Universal Pictures films
American black-and-white films
Silent American comedy films
1916 comedy films
1910s American films